{{DISPLAYTITLE:CH2O2}}
The molecular formula CH2O2 (molar mass: 46.03 g/mol) may refer to:

 Dihydroxymethylidene
 Dioxirane, an unstable cyclic peroxide
 Formic acid, an organic acid
 Methylenedioxy, a functional group